Wiggins is a city in and the county seat of Stone County, Mississippi, United States. It is part of the Gulfport–Biloxi, Mississippi Metropolitan Statistical Area. The population was 4,272 at the 2020 census.

History
Wiggins is named after Wiggins Hatten, the father of Madison Hatten, one of the area's original homesteaders. It was incorporated in 1904, and the 1910 census reported 980 residents. In the early 1900s, Wiggins prospered along with the booming timber industry. Wiggins was once headquarters of the Finkbine Lumber Company.

On January 21, 1910, between the hours of 11 am and 1 pm, more than half of the Wiggins business district was destroyed by fire. The fire started from unknown origin in the Hammock Building, a lodging house, and spread rapidly because of strong winds from the northwest. With no city fire department or waterworks, the residents of Wiggins resorted to bucket brigades and dynamite to stop the fire, which was confined to the east side of the Gulf and Ship Island Railroad. The fire consumed 41 business establishments, including the Gulf and Ship Island Railroad depot. Only two or three residential dwellings were destroyed, because most homes were built away from the business district.

Wiggins has long been known for its pickle production, and at one time boasted of being home to the world's largest pickle processing facility. However, the pickle processing facility is now closed, and although the timber industry has declined since the boom years, it still sustains many businesses in Wiggins.

On June 22, 1935, a mob of 200 white people lynched a black man, R. D. McGee. A white girl had been attacked, and McGee was suspected as the culprit. He was roused from his bed, and taken before the girl. She identified him, a day later, based on the clothing her attacker had been wearing. The same day it was reported that Dewitt Armstrong, another African-American was flogged for making insulting remarks to white women. On November 21, 1938, another black man, Wilder McGowan, was lynched by a mob of 200 white men for allegedly assaulting a 74-year-old woman. An investigator found there was no merit to the charge against McGowan, but rather that he was lynched because he "Did not know his place," and in addition had rebuffed a group of white men who had invaded a negro dance hall "looking for some good-looking nigger women". His death certificate indicated strangulation by "rope party". Although seventeen men were identified as participating in the lynching, the justice department decided no action was merited. In 2016, a group of white students at Stone High School put a noose around a black student's neck. The student's parent alleged that local law enforcement discouraged their family from filing a report.

In June 2021, Wiggins voters elected their first African-American mayor, Darrell Berry, who had served as mayor pro temp since November 2020 and then interim mayor since January 2021, following the death of the city's incumbent mayor. Berry had been an elected Wiggins alderman during three mayoral terms (12 years) prior to his election as mayor. As of June 2021, the city had three African-Americans simultaneously serving on the city council.

Pine Hill

After the 1910 fire and until the 1960s, the center of commerce for Wiggins developed on both sides of Pine Avenue, that sloped downhill and eastward, perpendicular to U.S. Route 49 and Railroad Street (First Street), over a distance of one city block. Small shops were built mainly of brick and were mostly contiguous to each other. Over the years, the shops were occupied by numerous businesses that included drug stores, law offices, a grocery store, a shoe store, a dry cleaners, 5 & dime stores, auto supply store, barber shops, cafes, a movie theater, dry goods outlet, feed & seed outlet, an army surplus store, beauty salons, clothing stores, gift shops, County Library, and U.S. Post Office. In more recent years, the shops have served as real estate offices, CPA & tax preparer outlets, an antique store, newspaper office, ice cream shop, art & frame shop, food outlets, and stationery shop.

In the late 1960s, U.S. Route 49 bypassed the downtown area, and many businesses moved from Pine Hill to other locations within Wiggins. The old Wiggins High School and Elementary School buildings occupied a city block, situated at the base of Pine Hill. When the school buildings were demolished in the 1970s, the school land was dedicated to City use as Blaylock Park. In the 1980s, city and county business leaders saw a need for developing a sense of community and tourism by initiating an annual Pine Hill Day, which later became Pine Hill Festival. During Pine Hill Day, area residents offered items for sale as arts & crafts, in farmers' markets, and as local cuisine. To attract more visitors, other venues such as live music entertainment, competitive foot races, antique vehicle displays, commercial food vendors, and games for kids were added through the years, and the festival became a Spring event. In 2014, an estimated 15,000 people attended the 2-day festival.

Geography
The entrance to Flint Creek Water Park is located in the city, off Highway 29.

Demographics

2020 census

As of the 2020 United States census, there were 4,272 people, 1,348 households, and 889 families residing in the city.

2000 census
As of the 2000 United States census, there were 3,849 people, 1,380 households, and 1,000 families residing in the city. The population density was 357.8 people per square mile (138.1/km). There were 1,546 housing units at an average density of 143.7 per square mile (55.5/km). The racial makeup of the city was 67.60% White, 31.51% African American, 0.05% Native American, 0.16% Asian, 0.31% from other races, and 0.36% from two or more races. Hispanic or Latino of any race were 1.07% of the population.

There were 1,380 households, out of which 36.4% had children under the age of 18 living with them, 47.6% were married couples living together, 21.3% had a female householder with no husband present, and 27.5% were non-families. 23.5% of all households were made up of individuals, and 12.5% had someone living alone who was 65 years of age or older. The average household size was 2.66 and the average family size was 3.12.

In the city, the population was spread out, with 28.4% under the age of 18, 9.6% from 18 to 24, 26.3% from 25 to 44, 20.5% from 45 to 64, and 15.1% who were 65 years of age or older. The median age was 34 years. For every 100 females, there were 88.3 males. For every 100 females age 18 and over, there were 82.4 males.

The median income for a household in the city was $26,597, and the median income for a family was $31,591. Males had a median income of $27,262 versus $20,801 for females. The per capita income for the city was $13,813. About 22.3% of families and 25.4% of the population were below the poverty line, including 35.6% of those under age 18 and 18.8% of those age 65 or over.

Education
The City of Wiggins is served by the Stone County School District
Gateway Christian Academy (A private school, serving Nursery/Preschool–12.)

Media
Stone County Enterprise, "Your hometown newspaper since 1916"
Wiggins is part of Mississippi Gulf Coast Radio and Television Stations Market Area

Infrastructure
Airport: Dean Griffin Memorial Airport
Highways: U.S. Highway 49, Mississippi Highway 26, Mississippi Highway 29
Railroad: Kansas City Southern Railroad

Notable people
William Joel Blass, attorney and educator
Chris Boykin, CEO of Big Black Inc.
Jay Hanna “Dizzy” Dean, professional baseball player and radio personality, lived in the nearby Bond community
Justin Evans, American football player
Anthony Herrera, actor, soap opera star
Marcus Hinton, gridiron football player
Boyce Holleman, attorney and actor
Rebekah Jones, whistleblower whose claims the Office of Inspector General later found to be unsubstantiated or unfounded; those she accused were exonerated of any misconduct.
Fred Lewis, former Cincinnati Reds outfielder
Stevon Moore, retired from NFL Cleveland Browns and Baltimore Ravens
Taylor Spreitler, actress
Emilie Blackmore Stapp, author and philanthropist

See also

Wiggins Depot

References

External links

Cities in Mississippi
Cities in Stone County, Mississippi
County seats in Mississippi
Gulfport–Biloxi metropolitan area
1904 establishments in Mississippi